is a science fiction PC Engine and Super Famicom role-playing video game that combines sci-fi space exploration with strategic robot combat. This game is intended for experienced role-playing gamers only. The random encounters are high even for a Japanese role-playing game with a mid-to-late 1992 Super Famicom release date (e.g., Dragon Quest V: Hand of the Heavenly Bride) and the combat sequences (using melee attacks in addition to missiles and guns) are extremely slow. Two years later, a sequel was released for this game titled Cyber Knight II: Chikyū Teikoku no Yabō. The games were only released commercially in Japan, however there are a fan-translations from Japanese to English by Aeon Genesis.

Plot
In the 24th century, humankind has expanded into the reaches of outer space. Meanwhile, the Earth had already disappeared as the center of human civilization. Each star system served as independent nation; war had occurred between these "countries" several times in the past. This led to a high demand for mercenaries to fight these wars for money. Some of these mercenaries went on to become space pirates due to their insatiable demand for wealth.

The crew of the starship Swordfish are in an engagement with space pirates. Suddenly, the battle takes a turn for the worse and the crew activate their jump drive without a destination. They end up flung across the galaxy to the galactic core. The Swordfish however is badly damaged with many casualties. Even the captain was killed while en route to the mysterious destination. Only 26 of the crew survive, and only six of them are qualified for combat operations: the commander, two soldiers, a mechanic and a doctor. They are responsible for using the six giant "Module" mechanized suits available for them after the fight with the space pirates. They discover a human colony that is under attack by a relentless mechanical aliens dubbed "Berserkers".

The crew must fight back against the new alien threat and explore the galaxy in order to find a way to return to Earth.

Gameplay
The object is to power up the human crew members and their mechs through combat experience points, explore strange new worlds using tools/weapons, and solve the problems of each alien civilization. The first mission involves saving an Earth-like planet of big people with a circa 1992 technology level from robots who want to wipe out humanity. On that planet, the president and his wife assume the throne positions of that of a king and a queen, even though their planet is assumed to be a democracy. Other quests involving trading stuff for a universal translator, braving a lava planet, and even using hyperdrive to get from planet to planet.

Reception
On release, Famitsu magazine scored the PC Engine version of the game a 30 out of 40.

References

External links

Database of Super Famicom games 

1990 video games
Japan-exclusive video games
Role-playing video games
Science fiction video games
Single-player video games
Super Nintendo Entertainment System games
Tonkin House games
TurboGrafx-16 games
Video games about robots
Video games developed in Japan
Video games scored by Toshiaki Sakoda
Video games set in the 24th century
Video games about mecha